Saidul Islam (born 10 September 1996) is a Bangladeshi cricketer. He made his List A debut for Uttara Sporting Club in the 2018–19 Dhaka Premier Division Cricket League on 20 March 2019.

References

External links
 

1996 births
Living people
Bangladeshi cricketers
Uttara Sporting Club cricketers
Place of birth missing (living people)